Mieczysław Weinberg (8 December 1919 – 26 February 1996) was a Polish-born Soviet composer and pianist.

Names
Much confusion has been caused by different renditions of the composer's names. In official Polish documents made before he moved to the Soviet Union, his name was spelled as Mojsze Wajnberg, and in the world of Yiddish theater of antebellum Warsaw he was likewise known as Moishe Weinberg. After he moved to the Soviet Union, he was and still is known in Russian as Moisey Vaynberg. Among close friends in Russia, he would also go by his Polish diminutive "Mietek".

Re-transliteration of his surname from Cyrillic back into the Latin alphabet produced a variety of spellings, including "Weinberg", "Vainberg", and "Vaynberg". The form "Weinberg" is now the most frequently used English-language spelling, including in the latest edition of the Grove Dictionary of Music. It was also eventually adopted by Weinberg's first biographer, Per Skans, who had previously used "Vainberg".

Life

Early life in Poland
Weinberg was born on 8 December 1919 to a Jewish family in Warsaw. His father, a well-known conductor and composer of the Yiddish theater, moved to Warsaw from Kishinev, Moldova (at that time a part of the Russian Empire) in 1916 and worked as a violinist and conductor for the Yiddish theatre Scala in Warsaw, where the future composer joined him as pianist at the age of 10 and later as a musical director of several performances. His mother, Sonia Wajnberg (née Sura-Dwojra Sztern, 1888–1943), born in Odessa, Russian Empire (today part of Ukraine), was an actress in several Yiddish theater companies in Warsaw and Lodz. The family had already been the victim of anti-semitic violence in Bessarabia – some members of his family were killed during the Kishinev pogrom. One of the composer's cousins (a son of his father's sister Khaya Vaynberg) – Isay Abramovich Mishne – was the secretary of the Military Revolutionary Committee of the Baku Soviet commune and was executed in 1918 along with the other 26 Baku Commissars.

Weinberg entered the Warsaw Conservatory at the age of twelve, studying piano under Józef Turczyński, and graduated in 1939. Two works, his first string quartet and the Berceuse for piano, were composed before he fled to the Soviet Union at the outbreak of World War II. His parents and younger sister Esther, who remained behind, were interned at the Łódź Ghetto and were subsequently killed in the Trawniki concentration camp.

In the Soviet Union
Weinberg first settled in Minsk, where he studied composition under Vasily Zolotarev at the local conservatory. When Germany invaded the Soviet Union in 1941, Weinberg was evacuated to Tashkent, Uzbek SSR. He wrote works for the opera there, as well as met and later married his first wife, Natalia Vovsi, the daughter of Solomon Mikhoels. He also met Dmitri Shostakovich, who was impressed by his talent and became his close friend. Meeting Shostakovich had a profound effect on the younger man, who said later that, "It was as if I had been born anew". In 1943, he moved to Moscow at Shostakovich's urging.

Once in Moscow, Weinberg began to settle down and to work energetically, as evidenced by his increasing opus numbers: approximately 30 works from 1943 until 1948. Several of Weinberg's works were banned during the Zhdanovshchina of 1948, and, as a result, he was almost entirely ignored by the Soviet musical establishment; for a time he could make a living only by composing for the theatre and circus.  On 13 January 1948 Weinberg's father-in-law Mikhoels was assassinated in Minsk on Stalin's orders; shortly after Mikhoels's murder, Soviet agents began following Weinberg. In February 1953, he was arrested on charges of "Jewish bourgeois nationalism" in relation to the murder of his father-in-law as a part of the so-called "Doctors' plot": According to Vovsi, Shostakovich wrote to Lavrenti Beria to intercede on Weinberg's behalf, as well as agreeing to look after Weinberg's daughter if his wife were also arrested. Weinberg was released from jail after Stalin's death the following month and was officially rehabilitated shortly afterwards.

Thereafter Weinberg continued to live in Moscow, composing and occasionally performing as a pianist. He and Shostakovich lived near to one another, sharing ideas on a daily basis. Besides the admiration which Shostakovich frequently expressed for Weinberg's works, they were taken up by some of Russia's foremost performers and conductors, including Rudolf Barshai, Emil Gilels, Leonid Kogan, Kirill Kondrashin, Mstislav Rostropovich, Kurt Sanderling and Yevgeny Svetlanov.

Final years and posthumous reception

Towards the end of his life, Weinberg suffered from Crohn's disease and remained housebound for the last three years, although he continued to compose. He converted to Orthodox Christianity on 3 January 1996, less than two months before his death in Moscow. His funeral was held in the Church of the Resurrection of the Word.

A 2004 reviewer has considered him as "the third great Soviet composer, along with Prokofiev and Shostakovich". Ten years after his death, a concert premiere of his opera The Passenger in Moscow sparked a posthumous revival. The British director David Pountney staged the opera at the 2010 Bregenz Festival and restaged it at English National Opera in 2011. Thomas Sanderling has called Weinberg "a great discovery. Tragically, a discovery, because he didn’t gain much recognition within his lifetime besides from a circle of insiders in Russia."

Conversion to Christianity

Weinberg's conversion to Christianity has been the subject of controversy. In a 2016 interview, his eldest daughter, Victoria, questioned whether his baptism was undertaken voluntarily in light of his long-standing illness, and in his book on the composer, David Fanning alludes to rumors that Weinberg was baptised under pressure from his second wife, Olga Rakhalskaya, which she denied. She subsequently replied to these allegations by stating that involuntary baptism is sinful and of no value, and that Weinberg had been considering his conversion for about a year before he asked to be baptised in late November 1995. The composer's youngest daughter, Anna Weinberg, has written that "father was baptized in sound mind and firm memory, without the slightest pressure from any side; this was his deliberate and conscious decision, and why he did it is not for us to judge." A setting of the Lord's Prayer appears in the manuscript score of Weinberg's Symphony No. 21 from 1991.

Works

Weinberg's output includes 22 symphonies, various works for orchestra (including four chamber symphonies and two sinfoniettas), the Violin Concerto, 17 string quartets, 8 violin sonatas (three solo and five with piano), 24 preludes for cello and six cello sonatas (two with piano and four solo), four solo viola sonatas, six piano sonatas, numerous other instrumental works, as well as more than 40 film and animation scores (including The Cranes are Flying, Palme d'Or at the Cannes Film Festival, 1958).  He wrote seven operas, and considered one of them, The Passenger (Passazhirka) (written in 1967–68, premiered in 2006), to be his most important work. Beginning in 1994, new recordings and reissues of Melodiya recordings were released by Olympia, being among the first systematic efforts to bring Weinberg's music to a wider audience. Since then, numerous other labels have recorded his music, including Naxos, Chandos, ECM and Deutsche Grammophon.

According to Lyudmilla Nikitina, Weinberg emphasized the "neo-classical, rationalist clarity and proportion" of his works.

Weinberg's style can be described as modern yet accessible. His harmonic language is usually based on an expanded/free tonality mixed with occasional polytonality, such as in the Twentieth Symphony, and atonality, such as in the Twelfth String Quartet or the 24 Preludes for Solo Cello. His earlier works exhibit neo-Romantic tendencies and draw significantly on folk-music, whereas his later works, which came with improved social circumstances and greater compositional maturity, are more complex and austere. However, even in these later, more experimental works from the late 1960s, 70s and 80s, such as the Third Violin Sonata or the Tenth Symphony, which make liberal use of tone clusters and other devices, Weinberg retains a keen sense of tradition that variously manifests itself in the use of classical forms, more restrained tonality, or lyrical melodic lines. Many of his instrumental works contain highly virtuosic writing and make significant technical demands on performers.

Shostakovich and stylistic influences
Although he never formally studied with Shostakovich, the older composer was an important influence on Weinberg. This is particularly noticeable in his Twelfth Symphony (1975–1976, Op. 114), which is dedicated to the memory of Shostakovich and quotes from a number of the latter's works. Other explicit connections include the pianissimo passage with celesta which ends the Fifth Symphony (1962, Op. 76), reminiscent of Shostakovich's Fourth; the quote from one of Shostakovich's 24 Preludes and Fugues in Weinberg's Sixth Piano Sonata (1960, Op. 73); and numerous quotes from Shostakovich's First Cello Concerto and Cello Sonata in Weinberg's 21st Prelude for Solo Cello. These explicit connections should not be interpreted, however, to mean that musical influences went in only one direction, from Shostakovich to Weinberg. Shostakovich drew significant inspiration from Weinberg's Seventh Symphony for his Tenth String Quartet; Shostakovich also drew on some of the ideas in Weinberg's Ninth String Quartet for the slow movement of his Tenth Quartet (opening bars of Weinberg's Ninth), for his Eleventh Quartet (first movement of Weinberg's Ninth) and for his Twelfth Quartet (F-sharp major ending); and in his First Cello Concerto of 1959, Shostakovich re-used Weinberg's idea of a solo cello motif in the first movement that recurs at the end of the work to impart unity, from Weinberg's Cello Concerto (1948, Op. 43).

It is also important to note that Weinberg does not restrict himself to quoting Shostakovich. For example, Weinberg's Trumpet Concerto quotes Felix Mendelssohn's well-known Wedding March; his Second Piano Sonata (written in 1942, before moving to Moscow) quotes Haydn; and his Twenty First Symphony quotes a Chopin ballade. Such quotations are stylistic features shared by both Weinberg and Shostakovich.

More general similarities in musical language between Shostakovich and Weinberg include the use of extended melodies, repetitive themes, and methods of developing the musical material. However, Nikitina states that "already in the 60s it was obvious that Weinberg's style was individual and essentially different from the style of Shostakovich.".

Along with Shostakovich, Nikitina identifies Prokofiev, Nikolai Myaskovsky, Béla Bartók and Gustav Mahler as formative influences. Ethnic influences include not only Jewish music, but also Moldavian, Polish, Uzbek, and Armenian elements. Weinberg has been identified by a number of critics as the source of Shostakovich's own increased interest in Jewish themes.

Operas

 The Passenger, Op. 97 (1967/68) after the book by Zofia Posmysz
 The Love of d'Artagnan «Любовь Д’Артаньяна», after The Three Musketeers by Alexandre Dumas (1971)
 Pozdravlyayem! «Поздравляем!», Op. 111 after Mazel Tov by Sholem Aleichem (1975) 
 Lady Magnesia «Леди Магнезия», Op. 112 after Passion, Poison and Petrifaction by George Bernard Shaw (1975) 
 The Portrait, Op. 128 after Nikolai Gogol (1980) 
 The Idiot, Op. 144 after Dostoyevsky (1985)

Selected recordings

 Chamber Symphonies 1–4. East-West Chamber Orchestra/Rostislav Krimer. Naxos 8.574063 (2019) and 8.574210 (2021).
 Violin Concerto: several recordings, with soloists Leonid Kogan (1961), Linus Roth (2014) and Gidon Kremer (2021)
 Sonata For Clarinet & Piano (1945): Joaquin Valdepenas (clarinet), Dianne Werner (piano); Jewish Songs after Shmuel Halkin (1897–1960) for voice & piano, Op. 17 (1944): Richard Margison (tenor), Dianne Werner (piano); Piano Quintet (1944), Op. 18: ARC Ensemble, 2006. 
 Symphony No. 1 in G minor, Op.10, 1942; Symphony for string orchestra & harpsichord No. 7 in C major, Op. 81, 1964: Gothenburg Symphony Orchestra,  (cond.), Chandos, 2010. 
 Symphony No. 17, Op. 137 "Memory"; Symphonic Poem, Op. 143 "The Banners of Peace": USSR Radio Symphony Orchestra, Vladimir Fedoseyev (cond.), Olympia OCD 590, 1996.

Complete editions
 Complete Works for Solo Cello (24 Preludes and Four Sonatas): Yosif Feigelson, Naxos, 1996. 
 Complete String Quartets Vol. 1 – 6: Quatuor Danel, CPO, 2008–2012.
 Complete Songs Vol. 1: Olga Kalugina (soprano) and Svetlana Nikolayeva (mezzo-soprano), Dmitri Korostelyov (piano), Toccata Classics (with Russian sung texts and translations), 2008.

Video
 Opera The Passenger, Op. 97 (1967/68) sung in German, Polish, Russian, French, English, Czech, and Yiddish: Michelle Breedt, Elena Kelessidi, Roberto Sacca, Prague Philharmonic Choir, Vienna Symphony Orchestra Teodor Currentzis (cond.), David Pountney (dir.) at the Bregenzer Festspiele, 2010 (Non-DVD compatible Blu-ray).

Notes

References

Further reading

In English

Elphick, Daniel, Music Behind the Iron Curtain: Weinberg and his Polish Contemporaries (Cambridge: Cambridge University Press, 2019).

In German
Sapper, Manfred & Weichsel, Volker (ed.; in German): Die Macht der Musik. Mieczysław Weinberg: Eine Chronik in Tönen. Osteuropa 2010 nr 7 (+ CD). 
Mogl, Verena, »Juden, die ins Lied sich retten« – der Komponist Mieczysław Weinberg (1919–1996) in der Sowjetunion (Münster: Waxmann, 2017).
 Danuta Gwizdalanka: Der Passagier. Der Komponist Mieczysław Weinberg im Mahlstrom des zwanzigsten Jahrhunderts. Harrasowitz Verlag 2020, 

In Polish
Gwizdalanka, Danuta (2013): Mieczysław Wajnberg: kompozytor z trzech światów. Poznań 2013, 

In Russian
Khazdan, Evgenia Петербургская опера: «Идиот» в Мариинском театре (Petersburg Opera: "The Idiot" at the Mariinsky Theatre). Музыкальная академия. 2016, No. 4. С. 20–23. (in Russian, registration required)
Мечислав Вайнберг (1919—1996). Страницы биографии. Письма (Материалы международного форума). Москва, 2017.
Мечислав Вайнберг (1919—1996). Возвращение. Международный форум. Москва, Большой театр России, 2017.
 Данута Гвиздалянка. Мечислав Вайнберг — композитор трех миров. Пер. с польского Алексея Давтяна. СПб: Композитор • Санкт-Петербург, 2022.*

External links
 Mieczyslaw Weinberg: The Composer and His Music comprehensive site includes articles, quotations, commentary and categorized worklist
 The OREL Foundation short biography written by Simon Wynberg, links to media
 Mieczysław Weinberg culture.pl article
 Exhaustive Mieczysław Weinberg Discography includes worklist
 Weinberg & His Music 
 Researcher blog on Weinberg
 The International Mieczysław Weinberg Society includes worklist
 
 Khazdan E.: «Еврейские песни» Мечислава Вайнберга: поиск национальной идиомы “Yiddish Songs” of Mieczysław Weinberg: Finding a Jewish Idiom (dissertation, in Russian)

1919 births
1996 deaths
20th-century classical composers
Converts to Eastern Orthodoxy from Judaism
Chopin University of Music alumni
Jewish classical composers
Male film score composers
Musicians from Warsaw
Polish classical composers
Polish male classical composers
20th-century Polish Jews
Soviet classical composers
Soviet film score composers
Soviet male classical composers
Soviet opera composers
People with Crohn's disease
20th-century male musicians
Polish emigrants to the Soviet Union